This is a list of Royal Ordnance Factories.

 Royal Arsenal Factory No 1.
 Royal Small Arms Factory Enfield Factory No 2.
 Royal Powder Mill Factory No 31.
 ROF Aycliffe; Filling Factory No. 8
 ROF Beech Hill, Wigan
 ROF Birtley.
 ROF Bishopton; Explosive ROF (3 factories).
 ROF Blackburn.
 ROF Blackpole; SAA Factory No. 20. 
 ROF Brackla; Filling Factory No. 11.
 ROF Bridgend; Filling Factory No. 2.
 ROF Bridgwater; Explosive ROF. No. 37 (opened 1941 closed 2008)
 ROF Burghfield; Filling Factory No. 18 (later part of the Atomic Weapons Establishment (AWE)) .
 ROF Cardiff; Engineering ROF (later part of the Atomic Weapons Establishment (AWE)).
 ROF Chorley; Filling Factory No. 1.
 ROF Dalmuir; Engineering ROF.
 ROF Drigg; Explosive ROF.
 ROF Dunham on the Hill; Explosives storage depot 
 ROF Elstow; Filling Factory No. 16.
 ROF Fazakerley; Rifles Factory.
 ROF Featherstone; Filling Factory No. 17.
 ROF Glascoed; Filling Factory No. 3.
 ROF Hirwaun.
 ROF Irvine; Explosive ROF
 ROF Kirkby; Filling Factory No. 7.
 ROF Leeds; Engineering ROF.
 ROF Maltby; Rifles Factory.
 ROF Melmerby; Munitions Inspection Factory.
 ROF Newport; Engineering ROF.
 ROF Nottingham; Engineering ROF.
 ROF Patricroft; M/C Shop Engineering ROF.
 ROF Pembrey; Explosive ROF.
 ROF Poole; Engineering ROF.
 ROF Queniborough; Filling Factory No. 10.
 ROF Radway Green; SAA Factory No. 13.
 ROF Ranskill; Explosive ROF.
 ROF Risley; Filling Factory No. 6.
 ROF Rotherwas, Herefordshire, Filling Factory No. 4 
 ROF Ruddington, Nottinghamshire; Filling Factory No. 14.
 ROF Sellafield (later the nuclear establishment Sellafield).
 ROF Southall; SAA Filling Factory.
 ROF Summerfield; SAA Filling Factory.
 ROF Spennymoor; SAA Factory No. 21.
 ROF Steeton; SAA Factory No. 22.
 ROF Swynnerton; Filling Factory No. 5.
 ROF Theale; Engineering ROF.
 ROF Thorp Arch; Filling Factory No. 9.
 ROF Wrexham; Explosive ROF.

See also 
Filling Factories in the United Kingdom

References

Further reading
 Cocroft, Wayne D., (2000). Dangerous Energy: The archaeology of gunpowder and military explosives manufacture, Swindon: English Heritage, .
 Kohan, C. M., (1952). Works and Buildings: (History of the Second World War. United Kingdom Civil Series). London: HMSO & Longmans, Green and Co.

Government munitions production in the United Kingdom

Royal Ordnance Factories
Royal Ordnance Factories